Harry Randrianaivo (born 10 September 1966) is a retired Malagasy professional footballer.

International goals 
Scores and results list Madagascar's goal tally first, score column indicates score after each Madagascar goal.

References

1966 births
Living people
Malagasy footballers
Madagascar international footballers
Association football forwards